Samuel Morison is the name of:

 Samuel Eliot Morison (1887–1976), American historian and navy man
 Samuel Loring Morison (1944-2018), American intelligence analyst and grandson of S.E. Morison

See also 
 Samuel Morison Brown (1817–1856), Scottish chemist, poet and essayist
 , frigate
 Samuel Morris (disambiguation)